Chris Hooper may refer to:

 Chris Hooper (musician), Canadian musician with  the Grapes of Wrath
 Chris Hooper (basketball) (born 1991), American basketball player